I Am the Greatest  or I'm the Greatest may refer to:
"I am the greatest", a catch-phrase of the boxer Muhammad Ali
I Am the Greatest: The Adventures of Muhammad Ali, a cartoon television series featuring (and voiced by) Muhammad Ali
I Am the Greatest (Cassius Clay album) (1963), or its title song
I Am the Greatest (A House album) (1991)
"I'm the Greatest", a 1973 song by Ringo Starr from Ringo
"I Am The Greatest", a 1966 song by Spitfire from Electric Colour Climax
"I'm The Greatest", a song by Eric Morris and Buster's All Stars
"I'm The Greatest", a 1972 song by Old Shatterhand
"I'm The Greatest", a 1964 song by Ross McManus and the Joe Loss
"I Am the Greatest", a 2015 song by Logic on the album The Incredible True Story